Gary D. Roach (born February 5, 1964), sometimes credited as Gary Roach, is an American film editor. He is best known for collaborating with Clint Eastwood on 12 films.

Life and career
Roach began his career in 1996 as an apprentice film editor on Clint Eastwood's Absolute Power. On Eastwood's next film, Midnight in the Garden of Good and Evil (1997), Roach was an assistant editor and became part of Eastwood's regular editing crew alongside Joel Cox. Roach went on to receive assistant editor credits on Eastwood's subsequent films True Crime, Space Cowboys, Blood Work, Mystic River, Million Dollar Baby, and Flags of our Fathers. Non-Eastwood assistant editor credits include Catwoman (2004). His first co-editor credit came with the Eastwood-directed Piano Blues segment of Martin Scorsese's The Blues film documentary series in 2003. Roach continued editing other documentaries, such as The Music Never Ends (2007). Roach's first film editor credit was on 2006's Letters From Iwo Jima, which he shared with Joel Cox. His first solo film editor credit was on Rails & Ties for Alison Eastwood in 2007. In 2008, Roach shared editor credit with Joel Cox on Eastwood's Changeling and Gran Torino. He and Joel Cox received a nomination for the 2009 BAFTA Award for Best Editing for Changeling and for the 2015 Academy Award for Best Film Editing for American Sniper.

Filmography

Editor

Editorial department

Thanks

Awards

References

External links
 
 Gary D. Roach at The Hollywood Reporter

1964 births
Living people
American Cinema Editors
American film editors